Kaliska may refer to the following places:
Kaliska, Świecie County in Kuyavian-Pomeranian Voivodeship (north-central Poland)
Kaliska, Włocławek County in Kuyavian-Pomeranian Voivodeship (north-central Poland)
Kaliska, Masovian Voivodeship (east-central Poland)
Kaliska, Konin County in Greater Poland Voivodeship (west-central Poland)
Kaliska, Międzychód County in Greater Poland Voivodeship (west-central Poland)
Kaliska, Wągrowiec County in Greater Poland Voivodeship (west-central Poland)
Kaliska, Lubusz Voivodeship (west Poland)
Kaliska, Chojnice County in Pomeranian Voivodeship (north Poland)
Kaliska, Kartuzy County in Pomeranian Voivodeship (north Poland)
Kaliska, Gmina Kaliska in Pomeranian Voivodeship (north Poland)
Kaliska, Gmina Lubichowo in Pomeranian Voivodeship (north Poland)
Kaliska, Gryfino County in West Pomeranian Voivodeship (north-west Poland)
Kaliska, Szczecinek County in West Pomeranian Voivodeship (north-west Poland)
Łódź Kaliska railway station, the main railway station of Łódź

See also
Elena Kaliská, Slovak canoeist